William Ferrara (born June 30, 1991) is an American professional wrestler, formerly known on the indies by his ring name Spartan. He is currently signed to Ring of Honor (ROH), wrestling under his real name. He also works as an assistant trainer at the ROH Dojo.

Professional wrestling career

Ring of Honor (2013-2021) 
He made his debut in Ring of Honor on a dark match on September 6, teaming with Cheeseburger and Nick Merriman and winning his match against Aaron Solo, Mike Dean & Travis Banks. He competited for the first time on pay per view at Glory by Honor XII, on October 26, against The Romantic Touch in a losing effort. Then he started to wrestle with Bill Daly, forming "Team Benchmark". Their first tag team match occurred on February 22, and lost against War Machine (Hanson & Ray Rowe). They lost on April 18 at Future of Honor against The Briscoe Brothers. On September 29, he eliminated Jay Lethal during a battle royal. This allowed him to face Lethal later in the night for the ROH World Television Championship but he failed. On November 7, he lost his qualifying match for the 2015 Survival of the Fittest tournament against Tommaso Ciampa.

In January 2015, he participated at the 2015 edition of Top Prospect Tournament, where he beat J.Diesel and Beer City Bruiser before losing against Donovan Dijak in the finals. On June 20, he competed and won his match against Silas Young after a distraction from Dalton Castle but lost his grudge match at Death Before Dishonor XIII. On October 24, Ferrara got defeated by Adam Cole at the Glory By Honor XIV.

In 2017, Ferrara turned heel by turning on his longtime tag team partner Cheeseburger and formed a new team named "The Dawgs" with Rhett Titus.

Championships and accomplishments 
 Pro Wrestling Illustrated
 Ranked No. 220 of the top 500 singles wrestlers in the PWI 500 in 2015
 UWC Year-End Award
 Newcomer of the Year (2011)
 Warriors of Wrestling
 WOW Tag Team Championship (2 times) - with All-Star Lou (1) and Nero (1)

References 

1991 births
American male professional wrestlers
Living people
Professional wrestlers from New York (state)
Professional wrestling trainers
21st-century professional wrestlers
Professional wrestlers from New York City